Route 203 is a state highway in eastern Connecticut, running entirely within the town of Windham.

Route description

Route 203 begins as Windham Center Road at an intersection with Route 32 in the South Windham section of the town of Windham. The route heads northeast to cross the Shetucket River, then turns north heading towards Windham center. Route 203 then splits off from Route 14, which continues towards Willimantic. Route 203, now known as North Windham Road,  travels generally north for another  until its end at an intersection with US 6 in the North Windham section of town. It intersects the Air Line Trail  from US 6.

The section of Route 203 from Route 32 to Route 14 is designated a scenic road.

History
The southern half of modern Route 203 (from Route 32 to the north junction with Route 14) was part of the Windham and Mansfield Turnpike, which was chartered in 1800. In 1922, when Connecticut first assigned route numbers to its main roads, the road from South Windham to North Windham was designated as 'State Highway 222'. In the 1932 state highway renumbering, old Highway 222 was renumbered to Route 203. A reconfiguration of US 6 in North Windham in 1954 resulted in Route 203 ending beyond US 6 at the old US 6 alignment (which was now unsigned SR 682) for several years. This was rectified in 1962 when SR 682 was deleted and Route 203 cut back to end at current US 6.

Junction list

References

External links

203
Transportation in Windham County, Connecticut
Transportation in Windham, Connecticut